The Hamilton-Wentworth District School Board (HWDSB), formerly known as English-language Public District School Board No. 21 prior to 1999, is the public school board for the city of Hamilton. Established on January 1, 1998, via the amalgamation of the Hamilton and Wentworth County school boards, the board currently operates 93 elementary and secondary schools.

The board has approximately 50,000 students in its 93 neighbourhood schools. In addition to the programming offered at 88 elementary and 15 secondary schools, a number of alternative programs focusing on sports, academics, science, arts and languages are available. The current director of education is Sheryl Robinson Petrazzini.

Secondary schools

Elementary schools 

A.A. Greenleaf
A.M. Cunningham
Adelaide Hoodless Public School
Ancaster Meadow
Ancaster Senior Public School
Balaclava
Bellmoore
Bell-Stone
Bennetto
Beverly Central
Billy Green
Buchanan Park
C.B. Stirling
C.H.Bray
Cardinal Heights
Cathy Wever
Central
Chedoke
Collegiate Avenue
Cootes Paradise
Dalewood
Dr. J. Seaton
Dr. J.E Davey
Dundana
Dundas Central
Earl Kitchener
Eastdale
Elizabeth Bagshaw
Fessenden
Flamborough Centre
Franklin Road
G.L. Armstrong
Gatestone
Glen Brae
Glen Echo
Glenwood
Gordon Price
Green Acres
Greensville
Guy Brown
Helen Detwiler
Hess Street
Highview
Hillcrest
Holbrook
Huntington Park
James MacDonald
Kanétskare
King George
Lake Avenue
Lawfield
Lincoln Alexander
Linden Park
Lisgar
Mary Hopkins
Memorial - Hamilton
Memorial - Stoney Creek
Millgrove
Mount Albion
Mount Hope
Mountain View
Mountview
Norwood Park
Parkdale
Pauline Johnson
Prince of Wales
Queen Mary
Queen Victoria
Queensdale
R.A. Riddell
R.L. Hyslop
Ray Lewis
Richard Beasley
Ridgemount
Rosedale
Rousseau
Roxborough Park
Sir Isaac Brock
Sir Wilfrid Laurier
Sir William Osler
Spencer Valley
Strathcona
Tapleytown
Templemead
Tiffany Hills
Viscount Montgomery
W.H. Ballard
Westview
Westwood
Winona
Woodward Avenue
Yorkview

Former schools
Hamilton Central Collegiate Institute was a high school until 1985 and traced its history to Gore District Grammar School (1821) and Central School. Gore District and Central School merged in 1838, renamed as Hamilton High School in 1871, Hamilton Collegiate 1897, 
Hamilton Central Collegiate in 1923. HCI moved in to Central High School of Commerce (established 1897) in 1950 and closed with building reused as an Sanford Avenue elementary school from 1985 to 2011.

Queens Rangers Elementary school closed in 2019, after 60 years of service.

Trustees 
The HWDSB consists of 11 trustees elected from wards across the City of Hamilton. These wards either match or are the combination of multiple municipal wards for council elections. Trustees are elected for a four-year term during each municipal election. The last election for trustees was held on October 22, 2018. The next election for trustees will be held on October 24, 2022.

The Chair of the Board, the Vice-Chair and the Honorary Treasurer are elected at the Inaugural meeting of the Board, and serve for one year. Trustees are officials, elected to serve parents, students, taxpayers and the school system. They are the link between communities and the school board, ensuring Hamilton public schools meet the diverse needs of students in their communities. Student trustees are elected by Grade 7-12 students to represent the interests of students during deliberations and decision making of the board.

2022-2026 Board of Trustees

2018-2022 Board of Trustees

See also 

 Hamilton-Wentworth Catholic District School Board
 High Schools in Hamilton
 List of school districts in Ontario
 List of secondary schools in Ontario

References

External links 
 Official website

School districts in Ontario
Education in Hamilton, Ontario